Gulzar Banu (born 1963) is an Indian politician and former mayor of the Mangalore City Corporation, India. She is a 2 time corporator of Katipalla. A member of the Indian National Congress (INC), Banu is the sixth woman to hold the position of mayor.

Early life and background 
Bano studied till the class 8 and then she married Shamsuddin. The couple has ten children, four are married.

Political career 
Banu won the 2012 mayoral election after the Bharatiya Janata Party (BJP) candidate, Roopa Bangera, was disqualified due to a failure to properly submit her caste certificate in the prescribed format within the given time, and that the certificate subsequently submitted by her was past the time stipulated for filing the nomination. As a result, Banu became the only running candidate and was hence declared elected by default. This incident came as a shock to many, since the BJP nominee was widely considered to be most likely to win. Due to the absence of any provision in the Karnataka Municipal Corporations Act, 1976, to call for a no-confidence motion, Banu was to serve as mayor for the proscribed term from 7 March 2012 to 20 February 2013. She took office on 7 March 2012, with BJP politician Amitakala as Deputy Mayor.

References

External links
 Gulzaar Banu new Mayor of Mangalore, Udayavani on youtube.com

1963 births
Living people
21st-century Indian Muslims
Indian National Congress politicians from Karnataka
Women mayors of places in Karnataka
Mayors of Mangalore
Mangaloreans
20th-century Indian women politicians
20th-century Indian politicians
21st-century Indian women politicians
21st-century Indian politicians
Women members of the Karnataka Legislative Assembly